Bellis (M916) is a  of the Belgian Naval Component, launched on 14 February 1986 at the Mercantile-Belyard shipyard in Rupelmonde and christened by Ellen Goffinet-Rosman, the wife of the then Mayor of Arlon, on 18 September 1986. The patronage of Bellis was accepted by the city of Arlon. It was the second of the Belgian Tripartite-class minehunters.

Commissioned on 13 August 1986, the ship participated the rescue of the survivors of ferry  in March 1987 which had capsized outside the port of Zeebrugge.

Bellis was attached to NATO's Mine Countermeasure Force (North) (MCMFORNORTH) in 1987, 1990, 1996, 1998, 1999, 2002 and 2004, and to Mine Countermeasures Force (South) (MCMFORSOUTH) in 1992, 1995, 1997, 1999, and 2003.

Pictures

References

Tripartite-class minehunters of the Belgian Navy
Ships built in Belgium
Ships built in France
Ships built in the Netherlands
1986 ships
Minehunters of Belgium